Rahmat Arjuna Reski (born on 30 April 2004) is an Indonesian professional footballer who plays as a winger for Liga 1 club Bali United.

Career

Bali United
On 4 December 2022, Rahmat was called up to Bali United senior team. He made his debut on 18 February 2023 in 2022–23 Liga 1 match against Persebaya when he replaced Yabes Roni in the 67th minute.

Career statistics

Club

Honours

Club
Bali United U-18
 Elite Pro Academy Liga 1 U-18: 2021

Individual
 Elite Pro Academy Liga 1 U-18 top goalscorers
 Elite Pro Academy Liga 1 U-18 best player

References

2004 births
Living people
Indonesian footballers
Liga 1 (Indonesia) players
Association football wingers
Bali United F.C. players